Ross Davis is a paralympic athlete from the United States competing mainly in category T34 sprint events.

Davis competed in three paralympics firstly in Barcelona, Spain in 1992 Summer Paralympics.  In these games he competed in the 100m, 200m, 400m and 800m for C3-4 athletes winning a silver medal in all four events.  In the 1996 Summer Paralympics in his home country, Davis won a gold medal in the 100m and a bronze in the 400m. Four years later in 2000 Summer Paralympics he won bronze medals in both the 200m and 400m and a gold medal in the T34 100m.

References

External links 
 

Paralympic track and field athletes of the United States
Athletes (track and field) at the 1992 Summer Paralympics
Athletes (track and field) at the 1996 Summer Paralympics
Athletes (track and field) at the 2000 Summer Paralympics
Paralympic gold medalists for the United States
Paralympic silver medalists for the United States
Paralympic bronze medalists for the United States
Living people
Medalists at the 1992 Summer Paralympics
Medalists at the 1996 Summer Paralympics
Medalists at the 2000 Summer Paralympics
Year of birth missing (living people)
Paralympic medalists in athletics (track and field)